The IAU 24 Hour World Championship is an annual international 24-hour run competition organised by the International Association of Ultrarunners (IAU).

Preceded in 2001 by the IAU World 24 Hours Track Championships, as a track running event, this competition became the IAU World 24 Hours Challenge in 2003. The road running event was later upgraded to World Championships status after 2006. It is one of the IAU's four main world championship events (alongside the 100 km World Championships, 50 km World Championships, and Trail World Championships) and is the only one with a limited time format, rather than a distance-based one.

The competition has often incorporated the IAU 24 Hour European Championships – a continental event which pre-dates the global competition, having first been held in 1992. The annual schedule has twice been broken: first in 2011, with Brugg, Switzerland failing to proceed as host, and again in 2014, with the agreed host (Pilzen, Czech Republic) being unable to hold the eleventh edition of the competition. The event has mainly been held in Europe: in 2006, Taipei became the first Asian city to hold the races and Drummondville, Quebec followed as the first North American host in 2007.

New Championship records were set at the 2019 Championship (awaiting ratification), including 278.972 kilometres by Aleksandr Sorokin from Lithuania and 270.119 kilometres by Camille Herron. from the United States.

Editions

Medallists

Men's individual

Men's team

Women's individual

Women's team

References

Medalists
Michiels, Paul & Milroy, Andy (2013-05-07).  IAU 24 Hour Championships. Association of Road Running Statisticians. Retrieved on 2015-03-21.
All-Time Winners. International Association of Ultrarunners. Retrieved on 2015-03-21.

External links
 IAU 24 Hour World Championship at statistik.d-u-v.org

24 Hour
Ultramarathons
Recurring sporting events established in 2003